is a passenger railway station on the Kawagoe Line located in Kita-ku, Saitama, Saitama Prefecture, Japan, operated by East Japan Railway Company (JR East).

Lines
Services operate every 20 minutes during the daytime.

Station layout
The station has two side platforms serving two tracks, with an elevated station building. The station is staffed.

Platforms

History

The station opened on 22 July 1940. The line was electrified on 30 September 1985, from which date through-running began to and from the Saikyo Line. With the privatization of Japanese National Railways (JNR) on 1 April 1987, the station came under the control of JR East.

From March 2010, rebuilding work started, adding new entrances on both north and south sides of the station, with escalators leading up to a section in front of the gate, bridging over the two train platforms. New elevators were added, as well as new toilets, one inside and one outside, next to the north entrance. The old entrance was closed, and the new station building was completed during 2011.

Passenger statistics
In fiscal 2019, the station was used by an average of 13,770 passengers daily (boarding passengers only).
The passenger figures for previous years are as shown below.

Surrounding area
 JR East Research & Development Centre
 Calsonic Kansei Headquarters and Research & Development Centre
 Miyahara Station on the Takasaki Line (15 minutes' walk)

See also
 List of railway stations in Japan

References

External links

 Nisshin Station information (JR East) 

Railway stations in Saitama Prefecture
Railway stations in Japan opened in 1940
Kawagoe Line
Stations of East Japan Railway Company
Railway stations in Saitama (city)